Temple Mall is a regional shopping mall and trade area located in Temple, Texas. It contains four major department store anchors, and a total of 57 tenants comprising a total of approximately 555,400 square feet of gross leasable area. The anchor stores are Dillard's. Junior anchors are Planet Fitness and Premiere Cinemas. There are 3 vacant anchor store that were once Dillard's,JCPenney,and Steve & Barry's. Premiere Cinemas last day of operation was December 25th, 2022.

Temple Mall is one of two regional malls in Bell County, with the other being Killeen Mall, in nearby Killeen, Texas. The Sears anchor store closed and was replaced in 1995 by Foley's. Foley's became Macy's in 2006. Macy's closed in 2016 and Dillard's closed their store across the mall and relocated to the former Macy's space in 2017.

On December 17, 2020, it was announced that JCPenney would closing in March 2021 as part of a plan to close 15 stores nationwide. After JCPenney closes, Dillard's will be the only traditional anchor store left. Kohan Retail Investment Group purchased the mall in late October 2021.

References

External links
Temple Mall home page
Temple Mall at Urban Retail Properties

Shopping malls established in 1976
Shopping malls in Texas
Kohan Retail Investment Group